Eckwersheim is a commune, in the Bas-Rhin department in Grand Est in north-eastern France.

On 14 November 2015 the commune was the location of a derailment during testing of a TGV train along the LGV Est high-speed rail line. At least ten people were killed after the train caught fire and plunged into the Marne–Rhine Canal.

Notable people
Engraver Henry Wolf was born in Eckwersheim, only to eventually live and die in New York City.

See also
 Communes of the Bas-Rhin department

References

Communes of Bas-Rhin